Bowes was launched in 1808 at Workington. In 1813 an American privateer captured her but the British Royal Navy quickly recaptured her. She traded with the Caribbean, South America, the Black Sea, and across the North Atlantic. She was last listed in 1863.

Career
Bowes first appeared in Lloyd's Register (LR) in 1808 with J.Bowman, master, W.Fell, owner, and trade Workington–West Indies.

Capture and recapture: The American privateer  captured Bowes, Dixon, master, in early 1813.   recaptured Bowes and took her into St Vincents on 6 February 1813.

In 1815 Bowes rescued the crew of Adventure. Adventure had sprung a leak and was scuttled by her crew around 29 March in the Atlantic Ocean whilst on a voyage from Jamaica to Liverpool. Bowes took the crew into Liverpool.

Lloyd's List reported that a letter from Constantinople dated 10 December 1823 stated that Bowes, Collins, master, had passed through the Bosphorus without a firman (written permission) and was now loading for Odessa.

On 13 August 1851 Bowes ran aground in the River Tyne at Hebburn. She was on a voyage from Dalhousie, New Brunswick, British North America to Newcastle upon Tyne

Fate
Bowes was last listed in 1864 with E.Penrice, master and trade Maryport coaster.

Citations

1808 ships
Age of Sail merchant ships of England
Captured ships
Maritime incidents in August 1851